Vice Admiral Mark David Hammond,  is a senior officer in the Royal Australian Navy (RAN), serving as the Chief of Navy since July 2022. He joined the RAN as an electronics technician in 1986 and, after being accepted for officer training, graduated from the Australian Defence Force Academy in 1990. Much of Hammond's career has been spent in the Submarine Service. He has served on operations in the Indo-Pacific, commanded the Collins-class submarine , was Deputy Chief of Navy from 2018 to 2020, and served as Commander Australian Fleet from November 2020 to June 2022. He succeeded Vice Admiral Michael Noonan as Chief of Navy on 6 July 2022.

Naval career
He was later accepted for officer training and, commissioned a midshipman, entered the Australian Defence Force Academy in 1988. Graduating from the academy with a Bachelor of Science in 1990, he was promoted sub-lieutenant and completed seamanship and navigation training before volunteering for the RAN Submarine Service. He then became flag lieutenant to the Chief of Navy and, in 1998, completed the Principal Warfare Officer's Course and Submarine Warfare Course.

In 2003, after completing the Dutch Submarine Command Course and the Prospective Commanding Officer Course with the United States Navy, Hammond was posted to RAN Headquarters as Staff Officer Future Concepts. He attended the Australian Command and Staff College the following year, graduating with a Master of Management in Defence Studies from the affiliated University of Canberra. In Farncomb, Hammond undertook "two years of demanding operations in the Indo Pacific region".

Following his period of command, Hammond was posted as Assistant Naval Attaché in Washington, D.C. He returned to Australia as Director Future Submarines – Operational Requirements, before being posted to Joint Operations Command as Joint Exercise Director (J75). He subsequently became Director Submarine Sub-Program (Collins and Future Submarines) and, in November 2012, was appointed chief of staff to the Chief of the Defence Force, General David Hurley. Hammond relinquished the post in December 2013 and, in 2014, was made Director General Maritime Operations.

Hammond was posted to the United States in 2017 as the Chief of the Defence Force Liaison Officer to the Chairman of the Joint Chiefs of Staff, then General Joseph Dunford. The following January, as part of the 2018 Australia Day Honours, Hammond was appointed a Member of the Order of Australia for his "exceptional service to the Australian Defence Force in senior command and staff roles". The citation for the award, in particular, praised his "demonstrated exceptional professionalism, leadership and dedication" and described Hammond as a "highly accomplished submarine commander". Hammond returned to Australia that March as Deputy Chief of Navy. After two and a half years in the role, he relinquished responsibility to Rear Admiral Christopher Smith in September 2020 and, on 17 November, succeeded Rear Admiral Jonathan Mead as Commander Australian Fleet.

In June 2022, the Deputy Prime Minister and Minister for Defence, Richard Marles, announced that Hammond would be appointed as the next Chief of Navy. Hammond succeeded Vice Admiral Michael Noonan in the role on 6 July 2022. He is the first graduate of the Australian Defence Force Academy to be appointed a service chief.

References

|-

|-

Graduates of the Australian Defence Force Academy
Living people
Members of the Order of Australia
Officers of the Legion of Merit
Royal Australian Navy admirals
Submarine commanders
University of Canberra alumni
University of New South Wales alumni
University of Wollongong alumni
Year of birth missing (living people)